Solomon Souza (born 1993) is a British-Israeli street artist. He is best known for spray painting portraits of contemporary and historical figures on the metal shutters of the Mahane Yehuda Market ("The Shuk") in Jerusalem, turning them into an after-hours attraction.

Personal life and education
Solomon Souza was born in London, and grew up in the neighbourhood of Hackney. His mother, British-Israeli painter Karen (Keren) Souza-Kohn, is one of the three daughters of a Goan artist F. N. Souza, and Czech Jewish actress Liselotte de Kristian (née Kohn). (His grandfather F. N. Souza's bestselling 1955 painting Birth depicts his grandmother Liselotte posing nude while pregnant with his mother Keren.) 
 
His younger sister Miriam is a filmmaker. He has been married to Ayelet Finkelstein
 since February 2021.

Largely self-taught, Solomon Souza has worked on murals since he was 14 years old.

Mahane Yehuda Market
As of July 2018, Souza had painted more than 250 of the 360 shutters in the market. Each painting takes two to four hours to complete. Souza usually completes three murals per night.

Subjects include contemporary and historical figures, including Yossi Banai, Roseanne Barr, Menachem Begin, David Ben-Gurion (painted upside-down), Albert Einstein, Mahatma Gandhi, Ze'ev Jabotinsky, Meyer Lansky, Emma Lazarus, Bob Marley, Matisyahu, Golda Meir, Moses Montefiore, Dona Gracia Nasi, Daniel Pearl, Jonathan Pollard, Naomi Shemer, Steven Spielberg, Hannah Szenes, Henrietta Szold, and Bracha Zefira. There are nearly one dozen rabbinical portraits, including Mordechai Eliyahu, Abraham Joshua Heschel, Yitzhak Kaduri, Maimonides, Shneur Zalman of Liadi, and Ovadia Yosef. Arab personalities are also represented, including Lucy Aharish, Sheikh Fari al-Jabari of Hebron, Si Ali Sakkat, and the Queen of Sheba. Biblical paintings include Moses, Solomon, and panels depicting the seven days of creation. Some of the early paintings are of the stall owners themselves, or their grandfathers, by personal request.

The murals have become an after-hours and Saturday attraction, when stalls are closed and the shutters and metal doors are visible.

Other murals
Solomon Souza was invited in 2019 by Vivek Menezes, the special projects curator for the Serendipity Arts Festival in Goa, India to do a similar art project there. Souza created murals of various prominent Goans, past and present.

In January 2020, Chelsea FC unveiled a mural by Solomon Souza on an outside wall of the West Stand at Stamford Bridge stadium. The mural is part of Chelsea's 'Say No to Antisemitism' campaign funded by club owner Roman Abramovich. Included on the mural are depictions of footballers Julius Hirsch and Árpád Weisz, who were killed at Auschwitz concentration camp, and Ron Jones, a British prisoner of war known as the 'Goalkeeper of Auschwitz'.

Other projects
In July 2021, Zionist activist Rudy Rochman and two other Israelis presented a Torah scroll, with its cover designed by Solomon Souza, to an Igbo Jewish community in Nigeria just before the three Israelis were arrested by the Nigerian police.

Gallery

References

External links

"Closed storefronts become colourful works of art" The Globe and Mail (slideshow)
"Graffiti art at Jerusalem's Mahane Yehuda market" The Guardian (slideshow)

1993 births
Living people
Jewish painters
Israeli graffiti artists
People from the London Borough of Hackney
People from Jerusalem
Painters from London
British emigrants to Israel